The Hong Kong Special Administrative Region Document of Identity for Visa Purposes is a biometric travel document issued by the Hong Kong Immigration Department to residents of Hong Kong who are unable to obtain a national passport. It is usually valid for seven years.

The majority are issued to citizens of the People's Republic of China who have migrated to Hong Kong on a One-way Permit, have lost their mainland hukou thus are unable to obtain a PRC passport, but have not resided in Hong Kong for the 7 years required to be eligible for a HKSAR passport. In 2009–2010, 54,554 Documents of Identity for Visa Purposes were issued.

Eligibility

The Document of Identity can be issued to the following categories of individuals who are connected with Hong Kong and who are unable to obtain a national passport or travel document from any other country:

Those on a limit of stay in Hong Kong
Those on unconditional stay (i.e. possess the right to land) who do not have the right of abode in Hong Kong
Those who have the right of abode in Hong Kong and hold a permanent identity card, but are not of Chinese nationality or ineligible for Chinese nationality

Physical appearance

Identification page

The identification page appears on a polycarbonate insert between the front cover and the first page. Using laser engraving technology, the holder's photograph is printed in black and white, with the holder's Hong Kong Identity Card number printed vertically on the right-hand side of the portrait photograph. The passport is also machine readable, designed for immigration control points equipped with passport scanners. Details which are printed include:

 Travel document type: PH
 Code of Issuing State: CHN
 Document number
 Surname and Given Names: in Traditional Chinese characters and English
 Nationality: 
 Sex: denoted as "M" (male) or "F" (female)
 Place of birth: if born in China, the name of the province/autonomous region/municipality/Special Administrative Region (i.e. Hong Kong or Macau); if born in other countries, the name of the country of birth
 Dates of birth, issuance and expiry: displayed in the format DD-MMM-YY
 Authority (of issue): "IMMIGRATION DEPARTMENT, HONG KONG SPECIAL ADMINISTRATIVE REGION" (in Chinese and English)

Use
As an international travel document, the Hong Kong Document of Identity may be used for entry into and exit from Hong Kong. However, since it is not a formal passport, there are certain restrictions. Few foreign countries and dependent territories which offer visa-free access to Hong Kong SAR passport holders confer the same privilege to holders of the Hong Kong SAR Document of Identity.

Since some holders of the Hong Kong SAR Document of Identity are not Chinese citizens (though the majority are new immigrants from other parts of China to Hong Kong and have been unable to obtain an ordinary Chinese passport), they are not entitled to the consular protection offered by the People's Republic of China government while overseas. However, Chinese foreign missions are able to assist should a Document of Identity become lost or stolen whilst abroad.

See also
Hong Kong Special Administrative Region passport
Right of abode issue, Hong Kong
History of Hong Kong

External links
Immigration Department: Hong Kong Special Administrative Region (HKSAR) Document of Identity for Visa Purposes
Justice Centre Hong Kong: New System for Protection Claims in Hong Kong

References

Foreign relations of Hong Kong
Passports
Identity documents
Refugees in Asia
Statelessness